Poka Makorer Ghor Bosoti is a 1996 Bangladeshi film. It was produced by Bobita and directed by Akhtaruzzaman. The film is based on Selina Hossain's 1986 novel of the same title. The film won four Bangladesh National Film Awards including the Best Film.

Cast
 Alamgir
 Bobita
 Khaled Khan
 Rawshan Jamil

Awards
Bangladesh National Film Awards
 Best Film
 Best Director
 Best Story
 Best Cinematography

References

External links

1996 films
Bengali-language Bangladeshi films
1990s Bengali-language films
Best Film Bachsas Award winners
Best Film National Film Award (Bangladesh) winners
Government of Bangladesh grants films
Films directed by Akhtaruzzaman